The China Open Resources for Education, or  CORE, was a non-profit organization that promoted closer interaction and open sharing of educational resources between Chinese and international universities. Its website is offline since 2013.

Overview
CORE was established in November 2003 following an MIT OpenCourseWare Conference in Beijing.

CORE was a consortium of universities that began with 26 IET Educational Foundation member universities and 44 China Radio and TV Universities, with a total enrollment of 5 million students. It aimed to provide Chinese universities with free and easy access to global open educational resources and provides the framework for Chinese-speaking universities to participate in the shared, global network of advanced courseware with MIT and other leading universities.

Lead universities 
Beijing Jiaotong University
Central South University
Dalian University of Technology
Harbin Institute of Technology
Nanjing University
Peking University
Shanghai Jiaotong University
Sichuan University
Tsinghua University
Xi'an Jiaotong University
Open University of China

See also 
Higher education in China

External links 
 https://web.archive.org/web/20130921210428/http://www.core.org.cn/

Tertiary educational websites
Open educational resources
Higher education in China
Distance education institutions based in China